Eberhard Westhofen (1820 1892) was a German architect and building official. He worked as a country architect in Cologne until 1847 and then as 'city architect' in Düsseldorf.

Life 
In 1888 Westhofen retired and received the Order of the Red Eagle IV. Class. Last residence at  2, Eberhard Westhofen died in 1892.

Realisations 

 Höhere Bürgerschule (Oberrealschule) at Fürstenwall 100, 1888.
 Neues Rathaus, Düsseldorf, 1884
 Kunstgewerbeschule Düsseldorf at Burgplatz, 1883
 Chapel in the Nordfriedhof, 1883
 New gate at Schlossturm Düsseldorf, 1883
 Leichenhaus, Golzheimer Friedhof, 1875 (destroyed during the Second World War)
 Municipal slaughterhouse in Golzheimer Insel, 1874
 Städtisches Lagerhaus, Reuterkaserne 1, 1866.
 Alte Tonhalle Düsseldorf, 1863
 Departemental-Irrenanstalt zu Düsseldorf, from 1879

References

Further reading 
 
 Willy Weyres, Albrecht Mann: Handbuch zur Rheinischen Baukunst des 19. Jahrhunderts 1800–1880. Cologne 1968, pp. 109 f.
 Eberhard Spohr: Die Befestigungsanlagen von Düsseldorf. Dissertation, RWTH Aachen, .

Historicist architects
19th-century German architects
1820 births
1892 deaths
Place of birth missing